Alex Cruz may refer to:
 Alex Cruz (astronomer), American astronomer
 Álex Cruz (businessman) (born 1966), Spanish businessman, ex Chief Executive of Vueling Airlines, and Chief Executive of British Airways
 Alex Cruz (footballer, born 1985), Brazilian football attacking midfielder
 Álex Cruz (footballer, born 1986), Spanish football left-back
 Álex Cruz (footballer, born 1990), Spanish football midfielder